Pierre Leyris (16 July 1907 – 4 January 2001) was a French translator.

He was also an incomparable translator of English-speaking poets, from Milton to T.S. Eliot. His four-volume translation of the works of William Blake, published by Aubier & Flammarion, remains the most complete in French and earned him the 1974 Prix Valery Larbaud..

Biography 
After studying at lycée Janson-de-Sailly, he appeared in the avant-garde literary circles. In high school he met Pierre Klossowski, who allowed him to meet his brother, the painter Balthus, and the poet Pierre Jean Jouve. By the 1930s, he began his translations on behalf of many publishers. From 1954 to 1961, he edited with Henri Evans a bilingual edition of Shakespeare's Complete Works at Club français du livre.
 
Long a collection director at the Mercure de France, he published Esquisse d'une anthologie de la poésie américaine du XIXe at Gallimard in 1995. A translator of more than 100 works, he received the National Grand Prix of Translation in 1985, but did not hesitate to "revise" himself after a few years. His mémoires were posthumously published.

Mémoires 
2002: Pour mémoire : ruminations d'un petit clerc à l'usage de ses frères humains et des vers légataires, Paris, J. Corti, series "Domaine français"

References

External links 

 Pierre Leyris on éditions Corti
 Pierre Leyris on Babelio
 Pierre Leyris on Encyclopedia Universalis
 Hommage à Pierre Leyris by François Mathieu
 Pierre Leyris La Chambre du traducteur on Fabula.org

Lycée Janson-de-Sailly alumni
English–French translators
Prix Valery Larbaud winners
1907 births
People from Ermont
2001 deaths
20th-century translators